Indian Deep Farm is a historic home and farm located in Newlin Township, Chester County, Pennsylvania. The house consists of a two-story, five bay, brick main block dated to the 1830s, with a two-story, two bay, stone core section.  Both the main block and core have gable roofs.  Also on the property is a stone and frame bank barn, shop, slaughterhouse, and 1 1/2-story frame tenant house built over a spring. The property also includes a stone walled stockyard.

It was added to the National Register of Historic Places in 1985.

References

Farms on the National Register of Historic Places in Pennsylvania
Houses in Chester County, Pennsylvania
National Register of Historic Places in Chester County, Pennsylvania